Lethbridge was a provincial electoral district in Alberta mandated to return a single member to the Legislative Assembly of Alberta from 1905 to 1909, and again from 1921 to 1971.

History

The riding has existed twice, from 1905 to 1909, and again from 1921 to 1971. The Lethbridge electoral district was founded as one of the original 25 electoral districts contested in the 1905 Alberta general election upon Alberta joining Confederation in September 1905. The electoral district was a continuation of the Lethbridge electoral district responsible for returning a single member to the Legislative Assembly of the Northwest Territories from 1891 to 1905.

In 1905, the Lethbridge electoral district covered a large patch of southern Alberta and was subsequently broken into Lethbridge District and Lethbridge City in 1909. After Lethbridge District was broken up into Taber and Little Bow in 1913, Lethbridge City was all that remained, using the Lethbridge name; in 1921 Lethbridge was reformed after City was dropped from the name.

The Lethbridge electoral district was abolished in the 1971 electoral district re-distribution, and the territory was formed into Lethbridge-East and Lethbridge-West electoral districts.

The riding was named after the Southern Alberta City of Lethbridge.

Representation
Liberal Leverett George DeVeber was elected as the first representative for the Lethbridge electoral district in 1905, DeVeber had previously held the Lethbridge seat in the Northwest Territories Legislature from 1898 to 1905. DeVeber's time as the representative was short as he was appointed to the Senate on March 8, 1906.

Election results

1905 general election

1906 by-election

1921 general election

1926 general election

1930 general election

1935 general election

1937 by-election

1940 general election

1944 general election

1948 general election

1952 general election

1955 general election

1959 general election

1963 general election

1967 general election

Plebiscite results

1923 prohibition plebiscite

1948 Electrification Plebiscite
District results from the first province wide plebiscite on electricity regulation.

1957 liquor plebiscite

On October 30, 1957 a stand-alone plebiscite was held province wide in all 50 of the then current provincial electoral districts in Alberta. The government decided to consult Alberta voters to decide on liquor sales and mixed drinking after a divisive debate in the Legislature. The plebiscite was intended to deal with the growing demand for reforming antiquated liquor control laws.

The plebiscite was conducted in two parts. Question A asked in all districts, asked the voters if the sale of liquor should be expanded in Alberta, while Question B asked in a handful of districts within the corporate limits of Calgary and Edmonton asked if men and woman were allowed to drink together in establishments.

Province wide Question A of the plebiscite passed in 33 of the 50 districts while Question B passed in all five districts. Lethbridge and Wetaskiwin were the only cities in Alberta to vote against the proposal. It was defeated by the narrowest margins with polls showing a clear split between the north and south sections of the city. The voter turnout in the district was well above the province wide average of 46% with well over half the electors turning out to vote.

Official district returns were released to the public on December 31, 1957. The Social Credit government in power at the time did not considered the results binding. However the results of the vote led the government to repeal all existing liquor legislation and introduce an entirely new Liquor Act.

Municipal districts lying inside electoral districts that voted against the Plebiscite such as Lethbridge were designated Local Option Zones by the Alberta Liquor Control Board and considered effective dry zones, business owners that wanted a license had to petition for a binding municipal plebiscite in order to be granted a license.

See also
List of Alberta provincial electoral districts
Lethbridge, Alberta, a city in Alberta, Canada
Lethbridge (N.W.T. electoral district), an electoral district of the Northwest Territories, Canada between 1891 and 1905

References

Further reading

External links
Elections Alberta
The Legislative Assembly of Alberta

Former provincial electoral districts of Alberta
Politics of Lethbridge